Goof Abaaley is a town in the southern Bay region of Somalia.

References
Goof Abaaley

Populated places in Bay, Somalia